An annular solar eclipse will occur on Saturday, October 14, 2023. A solar eclipse occurs when the Moon passes between Earth and the Sun, thereby totally or partly obscuring the image of the Sun for a viewer on Earth. An annular solar eclipse occurs when the Moon's apparent diameter is smaller than the Sun's, blocking most of the Sun's light and causing the Sun to look like an annulus (ring). An annular eclipse appears as a partial eclipse over a region of the Earth thousands of kilometres or miles wide.
This will be the second annular eclipse visible from Albuquerque in 11 years, where it crosses the path of the May 2012 eclipse. Occurring only 4.6 days after apogee (Apogee on October 10, 2023), the Moon's apparent diameter will be smaller.  It also coincides with the last day of the Albuquerque Balloon Fiesta.

Future total solar eclipses will cross the United States in April 2024 (12 states) (Saros 139, Ascending Node) and August 2045 (10 states) (Saros 136, Descending Node), and an annular solar eclipse will occur in June 2048 (9 states) (Saros 128, Descending Node).

Visibility

United States 
The path of the eclipse will begin to cross the United States in Oregon, entering at Dunes City, and passing over Newport, Crater Lake National Park, Umpqua and Fremont National Forests, Eugene, and Medford. After passing over the northeast corner of California (in the Modoc National Forest), it will travel through Nevada (passing over Black Rock Desert, Winnemucca and Elko) and Utah (passing over Fishlake National Forest, Canyonlands National Park, Glen Canyon National Recreation Area, and Bluff). After that, it will cover the northeast corner of Arizona (including Kayenta) and the southwest corner of Colorado (including Cortez and the Ute Mountain Reservation). In New Mexico, it will pass over Farmington, Albuquerque, Santa Fe, Roswell and Carlsbad. Afterwards, it will enter Texas, passing over Midland, Odessa, San Angelo, San Antonio and Corpus Christi before entering the Gulf of Mexico.

Mexico 
In Mexico, the eclipse will pass over the Yucatan Peninsula, covering Campeche City in Campeche State, Oxkutzcab in Yucatan State (coming close to Mérida), and Chetumal in Quintana Roo.

Central America 
In Belize, the eclipse will pass over Belmopan and Belize City before leaving land again; when it re-enters in Honduras, it will pass over La Ceiba and Catacamas, and in Nicaragua it will pass over Bluefields. The point of greatest eclipse will occur near the coast of Nicaragua. After that, in Costa Rica it will pass over Limon, and in Panama it will pass over Santiago and come close to Panama City. Its point of greatest duration will occur just off the coast of Nata, Panama.

South America 
In South America, the eclipse will enter Colombia from the Pacific Ocean and pass over Pereira, Armenia, Cali, Ibagué and Neiva. In Brazil, it will pass over the states of Amazonas (covering Fonte Boa, Tefé and Coari), Pará (covering Parauapebas and Xinguara), Tocantins (Araguaína) Maranhão (Balsas), Piauí (Picos), Ceará (Juazeiro do Norte), Pernambuco (Araripina), Paraíba (João Pessoa) and Rio Grande do Norte (Natal) before ending in the Atlantic Ocean.

Images 
Animated path

Related eclipses

Tzolkinex 
 Preceded: Solar eclipse of September 1, 2016
 Followed: Solar eclipse of November 25, 2030

Tritos 
 Preceded: Solar eclipse of November 13–14, 2012
 Followed: Solar eclipse of September 12, 2034

Half-Saros cycle 
 Preceded: Lunar eclipse of October 8, 2014
 Followed: Lunar eclipse of October 18, 2032

Solar Saros 134 
 Preceded: Solar eclipse of October 3, 2005
 Followed: Solar eclipse of October 24–25, 2041

Inex 
 Preceded: Solar eclipse of November 3, 1994
 Followed: Solar eclipse of September 22–23, 2052

Triad 
 Preceded: Solar eclipse of December 13–14, 1936
 Followed: Solar eclipse of August 15, 2110

Eclipses of 2023 
 A hybrid solar eclipse on April 20.
 A penumbral lunar eclipse on May 5.
 An annular solar eclipse on October 14.
 A partial lunar eclipse on October 28.

Solar eclipses of 2022–2025

Saros 134

Inex series

Tritos series

Metonic series

References

External links 

 NationalEclipse.com An educational site with overviews, maps, city data, events, animations, merchandise, historical information, and other resources for the 2023 eclipse and others.
 Eclipse2024.org An educational site with comprehensive eclipse information, an eclipse simulator and other resources for the 2023 and 2024 solar eclipses.

2023 10 14
2023 in science
2023 10 14
2023 10 14